Field Marshal Sir Cyril John Deverell  (9 November 1874 – 12 May 1947) was a British Army officer who served as Chief of the Imperial General Staff (CIGS), the professional head of the British Army, from 1936 to 1937. Prior to his becoming CIGS, he fought in the Fourth Anglo-Ashanti War and the First World War, during which he commanded at battalion, brigade and division level, and later advised the British government on the importance of maintaining the capability to mount an Expeditionary Force for operations on mainland Europe in the years leading up to the Second World War.

Early life
Deverell was born the son of Lieutenant John Baines Seddon Deverell and Harriet Strappini Deverell (née Roberts) and educated at Bedford School.

Military career
Deverell was commissioned into the Prince of Wales's West Yorkshire Regiment on 6 March 1895. He served in the Fourth Anglo-Ashanti War in 1896 and was then promoted to lieutenant on 3 August 1898. He was appointed adjutant of his regiment on 9 February 1904 before being promoted to captain on 23 February 1904.

He served in the First World War initially as brigade major for 85th Brigade, in which role he joined the British Expeditionary Force (BEF) and saw action at the Second Battle of Ypres in April 1915 before being promoted to major on 3 June 1915.

Deverell became Commanding Officer (CO) of the 1/4th Battalion, East Yorkshire Regiment in July 1915 and was then asked to command the 20th Brigade from 29 October 1915. Promoted to lieutenant colonel on 26 August 1916, he took part in the Battle of the Somme in the autumn of 1916. His brigade held a position on the 21st Division's right flank during the Battle of Bazentin Ridge and attacked the Switch Line to the east of High Wood. Promoted to the substantive rank of colonel and temporary major-general on 1 January 1917, Deverell was given command of the 3rd Division after its commander, Sir Aylmer Haldane, took over VI Corps.

He led the division at Arras in 1917, then participated in the latter stages of the Battle of Passchendaele. He returned to the Somme in 1918, before fighting alongside the Portuguese at the Battle of the Lys. The division participated in the Hundred Days Offensive, finally leading to the German surrender on 11 November 1918. He was appointed a Companion of the Order of the Bath in 1918 and awarded the Croix de guerre in 1919.
He commanded that division until 1 January 1919, when, having been promoted to substantive major general, he took over command of the 53rd (Welsh) Infantry Division.

On 13 December 1921 he moved to India. where he commanded the United Provinces District. Having been appointed a Knight Commander of the Order of the British Empire in the 1926 Birthday Honours, he served as Quartermaster-General of India from 25 February 1927 and, having been promoted to lieutenant general on 13 March 1928 and advanced to Knight Commander of the Order of the Bath in the Kings Birthday Honours 1929, he became Chief of the General Staff in India in 1930. He became General Officer Commanding-in-Chief of Western Command on 11 April 1931 and then, having been promoted to general on 21 April 1933, he was appointed General Officer Commanding-in-Chief of Eastern Command on 8 May 1933. He was appointed aide-de-camp general to the King on 10 February 1934, and promoted to field marshal on 15 May 1936, before assuming the position of Chief of the Imperial General Staff (CIGS) that same day. In that capacity he advised the Government on the importance of maintaining the capability to mount an expeditionary force for operations on mainland Europe. He was also colonel of the Prince of Wales's West Yorkshire Regiment from 21 March 1934.
  
In May 1937 Leslie Hore-Belisha, the newly appointed Secretary of State for War, sought to implement a new policy of limiting expenditure on the Army, particularly on the development of tanks, and when Deverell failed to show enthusiasm for that policy in the context of an increasing threat from Nazi Germany, Hore-Belisha wrote to him advising him that he had been removed from office. Deverell wrote a reply to the Secretary of State, strongly objecting to the adverse comments that had been made on his own performance, and retired from the British Army on 6 December 1937.

Retirement

On leaving the British Army he became Deputy Lieutenant of Southampton. His interests included local politics, he served on a borough council, and chaired the local defence committee during the Second World War. He lived at Court Lodge in Lymington, where he died on 12 May 1947 at the age of 72. His body was cremated at Bournemouth Crematorium.

Family
In 1902 he married Hilda Grant-Dalton; they had a son and a daughter.

References

Bibliography

External links
British Army Officers
Generals of World War II

|-

|-
 

|-
 

|-
 

|-

 

|-

1874 births
1947 deaths
Guernsey people
British field marshals
British Army generals of World War I
Knights Commander of the Order of the British Empire
Knights Grand Cross of the Order of the Bath
People educated at Bedford School
West Yorkshire Regiment officers
Chiefs of the Imperial General Staff
Graduates of the Staff College, Quetta